Two ships of the Royal Navy have been named HMS Skate after the fish:

  was an  destroyer in commission from 1917 to 1947.

Royal Navy ship names